The European Multisport Club Association (EMCA) is a sports organization representing the interests of multisport clubs in Europe. It was created with an initiative of the multisport club S.S. Lazio.

EMCA is also a partner of the House of Sport and member of the European Platform for Sport Innovation.

Purpose 
The aim is the development and dissemination of sports, as a mean of psycho-physical and moral integrity, promoting the activities of the affiliated sports clubs operating on European scale and organizing projects, erasmus trips and events for the exchange of good practice, sports promotion, maintenance of the human body in shape and entertainment youth activities. Particular attention is given at the fight against doping, intolerance and violence, access to sport for people with disabilities, social inclusion of immigrants and gender equality.

In the European sport system a significant role is played by multisport clubs, who – through their multiple involvement on a large variety of sports – understand better than anyone else the different social dimensions, impacts and needs of sports.

Projects

EMCA organizes projects in association with erasmus trips, to promote, the Olympic Spirit, spread of values and civic behaviour, importance of physical activity, voluntary activities,  integration of young refugees, multisport approach of young athletes and to report fraud, bribery, abuse, bullying and manipulated illegal sport betting. Finally, particular interest represents the acquisition of new knowledge and skills, through teaching and education, for multisport coaches' development, helping kids choose the most suitable sport.

Founding members
The following six clubs signed the «Multisport Declaration» in 2013:

 S.S. Lazio
 Ferencvaros Budapest
 Panionios G.S.S.
 Olympiacos C.F.P.
 Racing Club de France
 Sporting Clube de Portugal

All EMCA members
List of clubs in 2022.

Decorated Clubs 
The following table includes founding and rest EMCA members with multiple European title-winning sport departments.

* Founding members are above the borderline, and rest members are under the borderline.

* Individual-sport departments appear with a cyan background.

* M = Men, W = Women

See also
European Club Association

References

External links

Sport & Support  Project

Sports organizations of Europe
International organizations based in Europe
2013 establishments in Europe
Sports organizations established in 2013